Shane Greenaway is a Montserratian international footballer who plays as a midfielder.

Career
Greenaway played for Bata Falcons in the Montserrat Championship. He has also represented the Montserrat national football team.

Style of play
He has been called the Montserratian Michael Owen. He is a pacey player with good agility.

References

Montserratian footballers
Montserrat international footballers
1983 births
Living people
Association football midfielders